Harshit Shatrughan Bisht (born 5 October 1999) is an Indian cricketer. He made his Twenty20 debut on 9 November 2019, for Uttarakhand in the 2019–20 Syed Mushtaq Ali Trophy. He made his first-class debut on 19 January 2020, for Uttarakhand in the 2019–20 Ranji Trophy.

References

External links
 

1999 births
Living people
Indian cricketers
Uttarakhand cricketers
Place of birth missing (living people)